Eustathios Makrembolites (fl. c. 1150–1200), Latinized as Eustathius Macrembolites, was a Byzantine revivalist of the Greek romance, flourished in the second half of the 12th century CE. He is sometimes conflated/equated with his contemporary, the Eparch of the City Eumathios Makrembolites.

His title Protonobilissimus shows him to have been a person of distinction and, if he is also correctly described in the manuscripts as chief keeper of the ecclesiastical archives, he must have been a Christian. He was the author of a Byzantine novel, The Story of Hysmine and Hysminias, in eleven books.  Although he borrowed from Homer and other Attic poets, the chief source of his phraseology was the rhetorician Choricius of Gaza. The style is remarkable for the absence of hiatus and a laboured use of antithesis. The digressions on works of art, apparently the result of personal observation, are considered by some scholars the best part of the work. The novel enjoyed a later influence in connection with the story tradition of Apollonius of Tyre—Eustathius' scene of the storm at sea and the heroine offered as a sacrifice being adapted in Book 8 of the Confessio Amantis of John Gower and, by way of that, forming a portion of the plot of William Shakespeare's Pericles, Prince of Tyre (particularly in Act III).

A collection of eleven Riddles, of which solutions were written by the grammarian Manuel Holobolos, is also attributed to Eustathius.

Editions
Isidor Hilberg (1876), edition of both romance and riddles, with critical apparatus and prolegomena, including the solutions. He fixes the date of Eustathius between 850 and 988.
M. Treu (1893), edition of the Riddles alone.
Four Byzantine Novels, translated with introductions and notes by Elizabeth Jeffreys, Liverpool University Press, 2012. Includes English translation of Hysmine and Hyminias.

Notes

References
 This work in turn cites:
J. C. Dunlop, History of Fiction (1888), new ed. in Bohn's Standard Library
E. Rohde, Der griechische Roman (1900)
Karl Krumbacher, Geschichte der byzantinischen Litteratur (1897)

Riddles
12th-century Byzantine people
12th-century Byzantine writers
Eustathios